Louisville Muhammad Ali International Airport , formerly known as simply Louisville International Airport, is a civil-military airport in Louisville in Jefferson County, Kentucky. Its IATA airport code, SDF, is based on the airport's former name, Standiford Field. It has no regularly-scheduled international passenger flights, but it is a port of entry, as it handles numerous international cargo flights through the United Parcel Service's worldwide air hub through its airline, often referred to as UPS Worldport.

Over 4.2 million passengers and over 5.7 billion pounds (2.89 million tons) of cargo passed through the airport in 2019. It is also the second-busiest in the United States in terms of cargo traffic, and fourth-busiest for such in the world. The National Plan of Integrated Airport Systems for 2011–2015 categorized it as a "primary commercial service" airport since it has over 10,000 passenger boardings (enplanements) per year. Federal Aviation Administration records show the airport had 1,877,861 revenue enplanements in 2018, an increase of 11.46% from 1,684,738 in 2017.

Because of UPS Airlines' operations, Louisville International Airport is the second-busiest cargo airport in the United States, only falling short of FedEx's SuperHub at Memphis International Airport, and also the world's fourth-busiest airport by cargo traffic, behind Shanghai Pudong, Memphis and Hong Kong. The Kentucky Air National Guard's 123d Airlift Wing operates C-130 transport aircraft from the co-located Louisville Air National Guard Base.

On January 16, 2019, the Regional Airport Authority voted to change the name of the airport to Louisville Muhammad Ali International Airport in honor of the boxer and Louisville native Muhammad Ali. On June 6, 2019, the airport unveiled its new logo, featuring "Ali's silhouette, arms up and victorious, against the background of a butterfly."

History
Standiford Field was built by the Army Corps of Engineers in 1941 on a parcel of land south of Louisville that was found not to have flooded during the Ohio River flood of 1937. It was named for Dr. Elisha David Standiford, a local businessman and politician, who was active in transportation issues and owned part of the land. The field remained under Army control until 1947, when it was turned over to the Louisville Air Board for commercial operations.

Until around 1947, Bowman Field was Louisville's main airport. For many years, passenger traffic went through the small brick Lee Terminal at Standiford Field. Today's more modern and much larger facilities were built in the 1980s. Most of the Lee Terminal was later torn down.

When Standiford Field was built by the U.S. Army Corps of Engineers in 1941, it had one  runway. The airfield opened to the public in 1947 and all commercial service from Bowman Field moved to Standiford Field. American, Eastern, and TWA were the first airlines and had 1,300 passengers a week. The airlines used World War II barracks on the east side of the field until May 25, 1950, when a proper terminal opened. The three runways (1, 6 and 11) were all 5000 ft.

The April 1957 Official Airline Guide shows 45 weekday departures on Eastern Airlines, 19 American, 9 TWA, 4 Piedmont and 2 Ozark. Scheduled jet flights (Eastern 720s to Idlewild) began in January–February 1962.

In 1970, the terminal again expanded; the main lobby was extended and the  Delta Air Lines concourse was built.

The 1980s brought plans for a new terminal, the Louisville Airport Improvement plan (LAIP). Construction of a new landside terminal designed by Bickel-Gibson Associated Architects Inc. began, costing $35 million with capacity for nearly 2 million passengers in 1985. Parallel runways, needed for expanded UPS operations, were part of the airport expansion. Most of the improvements were completed in the 1990s and the airport was totally renewed.

During the 1990s, Southwest Airlines began service to the airport which helped passenger boardings increase 97.3 percent. In 1995, the airport's name was changed from Standiford Field to Louisville International Airport. The Kentucky Air National Guard moved its base to SDF with 8 military aircraft; a new UPS air mail facility, new corporate hangars, a four-level parking garage and a new control tower were also added. A new FBO was added, run by Atlantic Aviation and managed by Michael Perry.

In 2005, a $26 million terminal renovation designed by Gensler Inc. was completed.

On January 16, 2019, the Louisville Regional Airport Authority voted to rename the airport Louisville Muhammad Ali International Airport, after boxing legend Muhammad Ali, a Louisville native.

It also marks another major milestone of the SDF NEXT Programme, that will see a $500 million investment in improvements to the airfield and terminal in the coming years.

Facilities

Terminal
The Jerry E. Abramson Terminal is the airport's main commercial terminal. It consists of two floors with ground transportation and baggage claim services on the first floor and ticketing, passenger drop off, and concourse access on the second floor. There are 24 gates in the two concourses.  These concourses are connected by a rotunda and connector that contains a unified security checkpoint located in the main section of the terminal.

Concourse A contains 12 gates  
Concourse B contains 12 gates

Runways
Louisville Muhammad Ali International Airport has three concrete runways, two of which are parallel with one crosswind.

Worldport

Worldport is the worldwide air hub for UPS (United Parcel Service) located at Louisville Muhammad Ali International Airport. Because of UPS, Louisville is the fourth-busiest cargo airport in the world, and the second busiest in the United States. Although UPS has had a hub at Louisville since 1980, the term was not used officially by the company until 2002, after a $1billion, five-year expansion. Previously, the project was named Hub 2000. The facility is currently the size of 5.2million square feet (48 ha; 80 football fields) and capable of handling 115 packages per second, or 416,000 per hour. With more than 20,000 employees, UPS is one of the largest employers in both the city of Louisville and Kentucky as a whole. The facility, which serves all of the company's major international and domestic hubs, mainly handles express and international packages and letters. 

A  expansion was completed in spring 2006 to integrate heavy freight into the UPS system. The expansion was prefaced by the purchase of Menlo Worldwide Forwarding, formerly Emery Worldwide. The new facility, designated Worldport Freight Facility (HWP), went online in April 2006 and was the first of the company's regional hubs to begin integrating the Menlo volume into the system. Menlo's facility in Dayton, Ohio, was taken offline in June 2006.

In May 2006, UPS announced that for the third time in seven years it would significantly expand its Worldport hub, with a second investment of $1billion. Worldport sorting capacity was to expand from 300,000 packages per hour to 416,000 packages per hour.

Airlines and destinations

Passenger

Cargo

Statistics

Top destinations

Airline market share

Airport traffic

Accidents and incidents
September 28, 1953: Resort Airlines Flight 1081, a Curtiss C-46 Commando leased from the USAF, crashed on landing at Louisville-Standiford Field when the aircraft ballooned slightly during the flare-out, causing a loss of control when it climbed to 300 feet and stalled. Out of the 41 on board, 22 passengers and 3 crew were killed. Failure of the left elevator during landing was the cause.

March 10, 1957: an Eastern Airlines Martin 4-0-4 crash-landed at SDF. All 34 passengers and crew survived with just one serious injury. The pilot's improper landing approach caused an excessive sink rate, causing a portion of the left wing to separate inboard of the #1 engine and left the aircraft partially inverted. The plane was damaged beyond repair.

September 8, 1970: Delta Air Lines Flight 439, a McDonnell Douglas DC-9 inbound from Chicago–O'Hare attempting an instrument landing at night at SDF landed 156 feet short of the runway threshold, hitting sloping terrain, becoming airborne, bouncing and then skidding down the runway for nearly 1,500 yards before coming to a stop. All five crew and 89 passengers survived. The aircraft was substantially damaged, but repaired and later put back into service. Pilot error was the cause.

June 7, 2005: UPS Airlines Flight 6971, a McDonnell Douglas MD-11 with four occupants aboard, suffered a collapse of the nose gear assembly after touchdown due to improper handling of the aircraft by the flying pilot after the main landing gear touchdown and the pilot-in-command's inadequate supervision during landing. The aircraft had substantial damage but was repaired and returned to service.

See also

 Kentucky World War II Army Airfields
 Bowman Field
 UPS Airlines
 World's busiest airports by cargo traffic
 Transportation in Louisville, Kentucky

References

External links

 Louisville International Airport, official site
 Kentucky Air National Guard, official web site
 Standiford Field ANG / Louisville International Airport at GlobalSecurity.org
 Aerial image from USGS The National Map
 
 

 
 Inside UPS' Worldport: How a shipping titan moves 2,000 packages every 17 seconds

Airports in Kentucky
Airports established in 1941
Transportation buildings and structures in Louisville, Kentucky
1941 establishments in Kentucky